Amylax is a genus of dinoflagellates belonging to the family Lingulodiniaceae.

Species:

Amylax buxus 
Amylax catenata 
Amylax diacantha

References

Gonyaulacales
Dinoflagellate genera